Ryan Leet is an ocean-going salvage/supply tugboat. The tugboat is owned and operated by Offshore Marine Supply Services Inc. Justin Beaune its registered director and owner. The vessel is based in Panama, and operating in the Caribbean.  she is used for towing of ships and barges, supply, ship-to-ship fuel transfers and fire and rescue.

Ryan Leet was built in Belgium for the French Government to aid tankers sailing along the French coastal area. Ryan Leet was one of two such heavy salvage tugs stationed offshore in the French sector of the English Channel, as well on the western coast of France and the Bay of Biscay. Her sole task was to escort "supertankers" and to be ready to tow these tankers if they broke down. Ryan Leet has the horsepower to tow supertankers up . She is also equipped with a firefighting and azimuth bow thruster DP2 system. The vessel was equipped with new dual engines and generators rebuilt in 1994, (EMD V20-645 E7B).

She was launched in 1978 and was previously known as Abeille Provence and Salvor Commander.

Among the vessels whose rescue or salvage she participated in were the container ship , the roll-on/roll-off vessel Camilla and the bulk carrier .

References

Tugboats of Canada
1977 ships